Faralla is a surname. Notable people with the surname include:

Lillian Faralla (1924–2019), American baseball player
Richard Faralla (1916–1996), American painter and sculptor